Humphry William Codrington (11 November 1876 – 7 November 1942) was a British colonial financial administrator. Codrington was a notable scholar in history, numismatics and inscriptions of Ceylon and was referred to by Dr Senerath Paranavitana as the foremost writer on Ceylon numismatics.

Born the eldest son of Rear Admiral William Codrington and the Honorable Mrs Codrington, he was educated at Winchester College and New College, Oxford. Having passed the colonial civil service examination he was posted to Ceylon in 1903 as a cadet in the Ceylon Civil Service. He served in Kalutara, Anuradhapura, Badulla and Nuwara Eliya, Kandy and retired in 1932 while serving as the Government Agent of the Central Province. He served in France during World War I and as a Air Raid Warden in during the Blitz in World War II.

His publications include:
 Catalogue on Coins in the Colombo Museum - 1904
 Ceylon Coins and Currency - 1924
 Diary of Sir John D'Oyly - 1917
 A Short History of Ceylon - 1926

He married Joyce Mary Bleaden in 1919 and had a daughter and two sons. H. W. Codrington died in London on 7 November 1942.

References

1876 births
1942 deaths
People educated at Winchester College
Alumni of New College, Oxford
Colonial Administrative Service officers
British civil servants in Ceylon
British numismatists
Sri Lankan numismatists